The All-Ireland Senior Hurling Championship of 1996 (known for sponsorship reasons as the Guinness Hurling Championship 1996) was the 110th staging of Ireland's premier hurling knock-out competition.  Wexford won the championship, beating Limerick 1–13 to 0–14 in the final at Croke Park, Dublin.

Teams

Personnel and kits

The championship

Format

Connacht Championship
Final: (1 match) This is a lone match between the two competing Connacht teams.  One team is eliminated at this stage, while the winners advance to the All-Ireland quarter-final where the play the winners of the All-Ireland preliminary round.

Leinster Championship
Preliminary Round 1: (1 match) This is a single match between the first two teams drawn from the province of Leinster.  One team is eliminated at this stage, while the winners advance to the preliminary round 2.

Preliminary Round 2: (1 match) The winner of the preliminary round 1 game joins another Leinster team to contest this game. One team is eliminated at this stage, while the winners advance to the quarter-finals.

Quarter-finals: (2 matches) The winner of the preliminary round 2 game joins three other Leinster teams to make up the two quarter-final pairings.  Two teams are eliminated at this stage, while two teams advance to the Leinster semi-finals.

Semi-finals: (2 matches) The winners of the two quarter-finals join two other Leinster teams to make up the semi-final pairings.  Two teams are eliminated at this stage, while two teams advance to the Leinster final.

Final: (1 match) The winners of the two semi-finals contest this game.  One team is eliminated at this stage, while the winners advance to the All-Ireland semi-final.

Munster Championship

Quarter-final: (2 matches) These are two lone matches between the first four teams drawn from the province of Munster.  Two teams are eliminated at this stage, while two teams advance to the semi-finals.

Semi-finals: (2 matches) The winners of the two quarter-finals join the other two Munster teams to make up the semi-final pairings.  Two teams are eliminated at this stage, while two teams advance to the final.

Final: (1 match) The winners of the two semi-finals contest this game.  One team is eliminated at this stage, while the winners advance to the All-Ireland semi-final.

Ulster Championship
Final: (1 match) This is a lone match between the two competing Ulster teams.  One team is eliminated at this stage, while the winners advance to the All-Ireland semi-final where the play the Munster champions.

All-Ireland Championship

Preliminary round 1: (1 match) This is a single match between the overseas teams of New York and London. One team is eliminated at this stage, while the winners advance to the preliminary round 2.

Preliminary round 2: (1 match) This is a single match between the winners of the preliminary round 1 and the All-Ireland 'B' champions. One team is eliminated at this stage, while the winners advance to the All-Ireland quarter-final.

Quarter-final: (1 match) This is a single match between the winners of the preliminary round 2 game and the Connacht champions. One team is eliminated at this stage, while the winners advance to the All-Ireland semi-final.

Semi-finals: (2 matches) The Munster and Leinster champions will play the winners of the lone quarter-final and the Ulster champions.  Two teams are eliminated at this stage, while the two winnerss advance to the All-Ireland final.

Final: (1 match) The two semi-final winners will contest the final.

Connacht Senior Hurling Championship

Ulster Senior Hurling Championship

Leinster Senior Hurling Championship

Munster Senior Hurling Championship

All-Ireland Senior Hurling Championship

Championship statistics

Scoring

First goal of the championship: Robert Galvin for Westmeath against Carlow (Leinster preliminary round 1)
Last goal of the championship: Tom Dempsey for Wexford against Limerick (All-Ireland final)
First hat-trick of the championship: Kevin Broderick for Galway against New York (All-Ireland quarter-final)
Widest winning margin: 26 points
Galway 4–22 : 0–8 New York (All-Ireland quarter-final)
Most goals in a match: 6
Offaly 4–17 : 2–10 Laois (Leinster semi-final)
Kerry 2–11 : 4–19 Tipperary (Munstersemi-final)
Most points in a match: 38
Wexford 2–23 : 2–15 Offaly (Leinster final)

Miscellaneous

 Cork's 3–18 to 1–8 defeat by Limerick in the Munster quarter-final was the team's biggest defeat since 1936.  It was also Cork's first championship defeat at home since 1923.

Top scorers

Season

Single game

Player facts

Debutantes
The following players made their début in the 1996 championship:

Retirees
The following players played their last game in the 1996 championship:

References
 Corry, Eoghan, The GAA Book of Lists (Hodder Headline Ireland, 2005).
 Donegan, Des, The Complete Handbook of Gaelic Games (DBA Publications Limited, 2005).
 Sweeney, Éamonn, Munster Hurling Legends (The O'Brien Press, 2002).

External links
All-Ireland Senior Hurling Championship 1996 Results

See also

1996